Israel FC: Genesis was a mixed martial arts event held by the Israel FC promotion on November 9, 2010  at the Nokia Arena in Tel Aviv, Israel. This was Israel FC's first event and featured multiple UFC veterans.  It was also announced that this would be the last fight for Shonie Carter.

The event was aired on PPV via gofightlive.tv for $9.99. Lenne Hardt was the announcer for the event.

Haim Gozali was the owner of this event

Official fight card

Undercard

Lightweight bout:  Roy Peretz vs.  Fabrice Riconneau

Roy Peretz defeated Fabric Riconneau via submission (triangle choke) at 3:00 of round 1.

Lightweight bout:  Ido Pariente vs.  Joshua Hewlett

Ido Pariente defeated Jousa Hewlett via submission (armbar) at 2:54 of round 1.

Lightweight bout:  Vitali Krbrsky vs.  Serob Minasyan

Vitali Krbrsky defeated Serob Minasyan via Unanimous Decision.

Lightweight bout:  Thiago Meller vs.  Ariel Abergel

Thiago Meller defeated Ariel Abergel via submission (armbar) at 0:35 of round 1.

Light Heavyweight bout:  Alexandro Ceconi vs.  Vitaly Shemetov

Alexandro Ceconi defeated Vitaly Shemetov via submission (triangle choke) at 4:48 of round 1.

Catchweight (176 lb) bout:  Shonie Carter vs.  Jeremy Knafo

Jeremy Knafo defeated Shonie Carter via Unanimous Decision. Shonie Carter announced his retirement after this fight.

Light Heavyweight bout:  Daniel Gracie vs.  Martin Wojcik

Daniel Gracie defeated Martin Wojcik via submission (rear naked choke)t 2:17 of round 1.

Main card

Light Heavyweight bout:  Rameau Thierry Sokoudjou vs.  Valdas Pocevicius

Rameau Thierry Sokoudjou defeated Valdas Pocevicius via Unanimous Decision.

Lightweight bout:  Hermes Franca vs.  Moshe Kaitz

Moshe Kaitz defeated Hermes Franca via Unanimous Decision (30-27, 30-27, 30-27)

Catchweight (181 lb) bout:  Frank Trigg vs.  Roy Neeman

Frank Trigg defeated Roy Neeman via TKO (punches) at 2:36 of round 1.

Heavyweight bout:  Jeff Monson vs.  Sergey Shemetov

Jeff Monson defeated Sergey Shemetov via submission (kimura) at 4:09 of round 1.

Catchweight (215 lb) bout:  Ricco Rodriguez vs.  Daniel Tabera

Ricco Rodriguez defeated Daniel Tabera via Unanimous Decision.

References

Mixed martial arts events
2010 in mixed martial arts
Mixed martial arts in Israel
Sport in Tel Aviv
2010 in Israeli sport